Marindvor may refer to:
Marindvor (Požega), a village in the City of Požega, Croatia
Marijin Dvor (Sarajevo), a neighborhood in Sarajevo, Bosnia and Herzegovina